Rodrigo de Sousa Coutinho, 1st Count of Linhares (4 August 1755 in Chaves – 26 January 1812 in Rio de Janeiro) was a Portuguese nobleman and politician.

Life 
Rodrigo de Sousa Coutinho was born in Chaves on 4 August 1755 to Francisco Inocêncio de Sousa Coutinho, Governor-General of Angola, and Ana Luísa Joaquina Teixeira da Silva de Andrade.

He attended the Royal College of Nobles and legal course at Coimbra University. He began his diplomatic career after the death of King Joseph I of Portugal in 1777 as envoy to the court at Turin.

With the transfer of the Portuguese Court to Portuguese Colonial Brazil he again became a government official.

He died in Rio de Janeiro on 26 January 1812.

1755 births
1812 deaths
Counts of Linhares
People from Chaves, Portugal
18th-century Portuguese people
University of Coimbra alumni
Portuguese nobility